Living in Fiction is an album by Fast Forward, released by Island Records in 1984. Fast Forward was formed by Ian Lloyd (former lead singer of the band Stories). This was the only album that they released.

The group shot a promotional video for the song "What's It Gonna Take", written by Gary O'Connor, that also appears on Molly Hatchet's No Guts...No Glory album.

Track listing
 "Living In Fiction" – 3:56
 "Play To Win" – 3:42
 "What's It Gonna Take" – 3:36
 "Tonite" – 4:05
 "She Broke Your Heart" – 3:04
 "Don't Walk Away" – 4:11
 "You're A Mystery To Me" – 3:45
 "Draw The Line" – 3:04
 "Where Did The Time Go" – 3:47
 "Watermusic II" – 2:35

Personnel
Fast Forward
Ian Lloyd – lead vocals
Bruce Fairbairn - horns, backing vocals
Jimmy Lowell - bass, synthesizers
Andrew Kirin - synthesizers
Patrick Mahassen - guitar, backing vocals
Rodney Higgs - drums
with:
Keith Scott – guitars
Brian Newcombe – bass
Jim Vallance – drums
David Sinclair – guitars
Dave Pickell – keyboards
Robert Minden – waterphone
Beau Hill – keyboards, backing vocals
Bob Rock – guitars

Other credits
Geoff Turner – Engineer
Mike Fraser – Engineer
Keith Stein – Engineer
Bob Rock – Mixer
Gregg Rodgers – Art Direction

External links
 Jim Vallance Music Page
 Jim Vallance List Of Recorded Songs 1975-1999

Fast Forward (band) albums
1984 debut albums
Island Records albums
Albums produced by Bruce Fairbairn